Ulu Bendul (alternatively spelt Ulu Bendol) is a nature reserve in Kuala Pilah District near the border with Seremban District, in central Negeri Sembilan, Malaysia. There is also a village nearby with the same name. The nature reserve is served by the Jalan Seremban-Kuala Pilah.

Bathing pools at the park were temporarily closed in September 2021 after several individuals were believed to have contracted leptospirosis or rotavirus infections there.

References

Nature sites of Malaysia
Nature conservation in Malaysia